Global Overseas Adoptees' Link (G.O.A.'L) is an organization in Seoul, South Korea, for adoptees.

History
The first major task of GOAL was to lobby for the inclusion of adoptees in the Overseas Koreans Act. This act was passed in 1999 and allowed adoptees residency on a F-4 visa. The visa gives every adoptee the right to reside and work in Korea for three years at a time and can be renewed.

On 29 December 2010, GOAL opened its first overseas branch, GOAL USA, in Santa Barbara.

Main Services
 Birth Family Search in cooperation with adoption agencies, Korean and international media (KBS, YTN, National Assembly TV etc.)
 Annual conference
 Translation, interpretation
 Korean language education and scholarships
 General support including F-4 visa
 Motherland tours

Activities

GOAL also ran the Dual Citizenship Campaign that granted adoptees Korean nationality. It is also advocating adoptees' rights within Korea.

References

External links

Korean migration
Adoption-related organizations
Child-related organizations in South Korea